The 2012 Macau Grand Prix Formula Three was a motor race for Formula Three cars that was held on the streets of Macau on 18 November 2012. Unlike other races, such as the Pau Grand Prix, the 2012 Macau Grand Prix was not a part of any Formula Three championship, but was open to entries from all Formula Three championships. The race itself was made up of two races: a ten-lap qualifying race that decided the starting grid for the fifteen-lap main race. The 2012 race was the 59th running of the Macau Grand Prix, the 30th race for Formula Three cars, and was supported by the World Touring Car Championship Guia Race of Macau.

The Grand Prix was won by Portuguese driver António Félix da Costa from pole position, having won the event's qualification race the previous afternoon. Félix da Costa led every lap of the meeting, to take Carlin's first victory in Macau since Takuma Sato won the 2001 edition of the race. Second place went to Felix Rosenqvist, competing for Mücke Motorsport, while the podium was completed by the highest-placed rookie driver, Alex Lynn for Fortec Motorsport.

Entry list and background
In order to compete at the Macau Grand Prix, drivers had to compete in any Formula Three championship race during the calendar year, rather than an FIA-regulated championship meeting like previous years. This rule was relaxed due to new sporting regulations introduced by the race's organising committee, with only Dallara's new F312 chassis being eligible to race in the event. Within the 30-car grid of the event, each of the major Formula Three series were represented by their respective champion. Defending race winner Daniel Juncadella, the Euro Series and FIA European Formula 3 champion, was joined in Macau by British champion Jack Harvey, German series winner Jimmy Eriksson and Japanese champion Ryō Hirakawa.

Five drivers who mainly competed in other series outside of Formula Three in 2012 also became eligible for the Macau race meeting: GP2 Series racer Felipe Nasr and European Le Mans Series driver Alexander Sims competed in the Euro Series – at Hockenheim, and the Nürburgring respectively – to become eligible, while GP3 Series runner-up Daniel Abt competed in the German Formula Three meeting at Spa-Francorchamps to prepare for Macau. Multiple GP3 and Formula Renault 3.5 race-winner António Félix da Costa and Formula Three debutant Kevin Korjus – another Formula Renault 3.5 competitor – had to wait until their main series campaigns had concluded before sealing their eligibility; they both competed in the MotorSport Vision Formula Three Cup, a second-tier Formula Three series in the United Kingdom, in its season-ending round at Snetterton.

The Macau Grand Prix is a Formula Three race considered to be a stepping stone to higher motor racing categories such as Formula One and has been termed the territory's most prestigious international sporting event. The 2012 Macau Grand Prix was the 59th running of the event and the 30th time the race was held to Formula Three regulations. It took place on the  twenty-two turn Guia Circuit on 18 November 2012 with three preceding days of practice and qualifying.

Practice and qualifying
Nasr set the fastest time for Carlin in the 45-minute first free practice session that was held – in cloudy conditions – prior to the first qualifying session, setting a lap time over two-tenths of a second quicker than anyone else at the Guia Circuit. His closest challenger was Mücke Motorsport's Felix Rosenqvist ahead of three of Nasr's Carlin teammates: Félix da Costa, Carlos Sainz Jr. and William Buller. Defending champion Juncadella was sixth for Prema Powerteam, ahead of the best-placed Macau debutant Pascal Wehrlein. Japanese series champion Hirakawa (RSS) caused the only red flag of the session by crashing heavily at R Bend, while five other drivers – all rookies with the exception of T-Sport driver Sims – also encountered incidents during the session.

Qualifying was divided into two sessions, both of which were 30 minutes. One session was held on 15 November and another was held on 16 November, with the best times of each driver counting towards the starting order for the qualifying race. The first qualifying session saw Félix da Costa come out on top, by just 0.02 seconds ahead of Rosenqvist, with Sainz another thousandth of a second in arrears in third place. Alex Lynn, in his last appearance for Fortec Motorsport before moving to the Prema Powerteam in 2013, was best rookie in fourth place having held the lead of the session at one point, while Juncadella rounded out the top five. Nasr finished the session in sixth place ahead of Sims and Prema Powerteam's Raffaele Marciello – the winner of the other invitational Formula Three race held on a street circuit, at Pau in France – with Félix Serrallés and Wehrlein rounding out the top ten. Following them were Abt, Tom Blomqvist with Pipo Derani and Hannes van Asseldonk provisionally lining up on row seven. Buller, a former Formula BMW Pacific winner at Macau, was next up ahead of Harry Tincknell, Jazeman Jaafar, Harvey, Sven Müller and Korjus. Andrea Roda caused the session's only red flag by crashing at the Reservoir Bend corner. Hirakawa did not complete a lap during qualifying, as his car was still being repaired after his earlier incident during the first free practice session. For weighing incidents during free practice, Hirakawa and Andrea Roda were each given three-place grid penalties.

In the second 45-minute practice session, Rosenqvist set a benchmark in the opening third of the session and the time ultimately held to the conclusion of it, with Juncadella and Félix da Costa marginally behind in second and third places respectively. Korjus continued his progression up the time-sheets with the fourth-fastest time, while Sainz completed the top five in the session ahead of Wehrlein, the best of the rookies. The session had to be stopped once due to a problem with one of the circuit's catch-fences, although Nasr brushed the wall en route to the tenth fastest time, while Yuichi Nakayama and Luís Sá Silva both crashed within the final five minutes of the session, leaving their TOM'S and Angola Racing teams with repair work to be carried out before the second qualifying session.

The second qualifying session was delayed by 15 minutes due to an incident during qualifying for the CTM Macau Touring Car Cup race, in which 2011 Road Sport Challenge race winner Phillip Yau was killed. When the session did start, the anticipated rain showers had not materialised, and Nasr moved to the top of the time-sheets before the first of three red flags for a crash by Serrallés. For a time, track conditions were slippery due to fluids that had to be cleaned up from Serrallés' accident. Juncadella recorded the fastest time midway through the session, with a time just one thousandth slower than Félix da Costa's Thursday best. Félix da Costa's time was eventually beaten by Lynn, taking almost three-tenths of a second off the previous best time just prior to a second red flag after Lucas Auer crashed. The session was eventually abandoned after a third red flag with around two minutes remaining when Nasr crashed at R Bend. Thus, Lynn became the first rookie since Kamui Kobayashi in 2006 to take pole position at Macau, doing so by 0.278 seconds ahead of Félix da Costa, who achieved a front-row grid start for the second successive year. Juncadella moved into third place – keeping his position despite failing a fuel sample test – ahead of Rosenqvist and Sainz, with Nasr remaining sixth ahead of Tincknell, Wehrlein and Abt, who all moved up from their Thursday provisional grid slots. The top ten was completed by Marciello; behind him, the top twenty qualifiers were rounded off by van Asseldonk, Derani, Harvey, Sims, Serrallés, Blomqvist, Buller, Yuichi Yamauchi, Jaafar, Müller Hirakawa and Roda's grid penalties were effectively rendered meaningless as they qualified at the rear of the grid. Korjus, Nakayama and Roda each received penalties after second qualifying; Roda was demoted ten for an engine change, while Korjus and Nakayama each dropped one spot for irregularities in the pit lane.

Qualifying classification
Each of the driver's fastest lap times from the two qualifying sessions are denoted in bold.

Notes
 – Serrallés started from the back of the grid, after an engine change.
 – Korjus was given a one-place grid penalty for infringing pit safety regulations.
 – Nakayama was also given a one-place grid penalty for infringing pit safety regulations.
 – Hirakawa was given a three-place grid penalty, for weighing irregularities during the first free practice session.
 – Roda was given a three-place grid penalty, for weighing irregularities during the first free practice session. He was later given a further grid drop of ten places, for an engine change.

Qualification Race

Prior to the start of the race, Serrallés started from the rear of the field due to an engine change after his qualifying crash, while Korjus failed to get away from the dummy grid on the parade lap. He did start the race, albeit, from the pit lane. On the grid, it was Rosenqvist that made the best start from the second row and managed to take the lead away from a slow-starting Lynn. Félix da Costa also moved ahead of Lynn into second place, before slipstreaming up behind Rosenqvist and was able to move ahead of him under braking for Lisboa turn. Behind, Sainz made a similar move on Juncadella for fourth place at the same corner, while later on the lap, Tincknell also made a move on Juncadella to demote the defending race-winner to sixth place. The top six drivers remained in the same order until the fourth lap, when Juncadella made it back past Tincknell. Further down the field, Nakayama became the race's first retirement by crashing out at Lisboa corner.

At the front of the race, Félix da Costa was maintaining a slim lead over Rosenqvist, at around one second with Lynn a further few seconds in arrears. Sainz was leading a group of drivers in fourth place, with Juncadella, Tincknell and Wehrlein in close attendance. Juncadella set the qualification race's fastest time on the fourth lap, completing a circuit in two minutes 13.718 seconds. Ultimately, it was Félix da Costa that took victory by 1.5 seconds and pole position for the Grand Prix itself, and was joined on the front row by Rosenqvist, while Lynn completed the podium after a quiet race. Behind him, Sainz managed to hold off the others in his group to finish fourth ahead of Juncadella, Tincknell, Wehrlein, van Asseldonk, Nasr and Sims. Outside the top ten, Marciello finished eleventh ahead of Harvey, Derani, Buller, Abt, Yamauchi, Blomqvist, Jaafar, Mitchell Gilbert, Korjus, Auer, Sá Silva, Hirakawa, Dennis van de Laar and Lucas Wolf rounded out the 26 classified finishers. Joining Nakayama on the sidelines were crashers Serrallés (at Paiol on lap seven), Roda (at Lisboa on lap nine) and Müller, who also crashed on the ninth lap at Police corner.

Qualification Race classification

Main Race
For the second day running, it was Rosenqvist that made the best start out of the front-runners, taking the lead from Félix da Costa on the run to the Mandarin corner, but Félix da Costa regained the lead under braking for Lisboa turn in a carbon-copy move to his first lap start in the qualification race. Behind, Sainz made a slow getaway from fourth place, while Sims stalled several rows behind him. The field made it cleanly out of Lisboa corner, before Sá Silva spun at the top of San Francisco Hill turn and nearly blocked the circuit while trying to return his car to the direction of the track. Around the next corner, Wolf became the race's first retirement as slight contact sent him into the barriers on the outside of Maternity Bend turn. Ultimately, the marshals had trouble extricating his car from the barriers and would eventually cause the race to be neutralised under safety car conditions; however, this did not occur for two further racing laps. Two more drivers suffered race-ending incidents during this time-frame, as van Asseldonk parked his Prema car in the Lisboa barriers on lap two while Juncadella hit the barriers at R Bend on the same lap. He was able to slowly make his way around another full lap, before retiring to the pit lane with suspension failure.

Racing resumed at the end of the sixth lap, with Félix da Costa holding onto the lead from Rosenqvist, despite pressure all the way to Lisboa turn from the pit straight. Lynn and Wehrlein fell in behind, with Nasr completing the top five, while Derani moved past Marciello for seventh place with a move down the inside under braking for Lisboa corner and later got the better of teammate Tincknell for sixth position. At the front, Félix da Costa had enough of an advantage to just about negate any threat that Rosenqvist could have made with the slipstream while Lynn continued his Macau initiation with a solid third place with Wehrlein doing likewise in fourth. Down the order, Harvey was another retiree in the pit lane due to front wing damage suffered on his Carlin car. The top five continued in their positions as the laps were continually racked off; with two laps to go, Hirakawa crashed at R Bend and was collected by Auer and left extensive debris from the corner all the way to the start-finish line. The safety car was not called for, but yellow flags were in effect until the end through that section of the course. Da Costa recorded the fastest lap of the main race on lap 11, completing a circuit in two minutes and 13.507 seconds.

Sá Silva and van de Laar came to grief on the final lap under braking for Lisboa corner; the cars of the two drivers touched wheels and sent them into retirement, although both drivers were ultimately classified in 23rd and 24th respectively. But, on his third appearance in Macau, it was Félix da Costa's victory, leading at the end of each of the 25 racing laps to have been completed over the weekend, achieving Carlin's first victory in Macau since Takuma Sato triumphed in the 2001 edition. Rosenqvist finished second once again, 1.5 seconds in arrears, while Lynn completed the podium in a repeat of Saturday's top three placings. The race organisers played out the wrong national anthem for the winner Félix da Costa, but after several minutes, A Portuguesa, the Portuguese national anthem, played out in the former Portuguese colony. Off the podium, Wehrlein finished in fourth place ahead of Nasr, both having been distanced by the lead group during the race. Derani took sixth place, having started thirteenth, ahead of Sainz and Marciello. The top ten was rounded out by British pairing Tincknell and Buller. Outside the top ten, Eriksson finished eleventh having moved up six from his start position, and finished ahead of Abt, with Korjus 13th ahead of Yamauchi, Sims, Jaafar, Blomqvist, Gilbert, Müller, Serrallés, Nakayama, Roda and the two drivers who retired in the closing stages – Sá Silva and van de Laar – rounded out the 24 classified finishers.

Main Race classification

References

External links
 

Macau Grand Prix Formula Three
Macau Grand Prix
Macau Grand Prix
Macau Grand Prix Formula Three